Barney Kessel (October 17, 1923 – May 6, 2004) was an American jazz guitarist born in Muskogee, Oklahoma. Known in particular for his knowledge of chords and inversions and chord-based melodies, he was a member of many prominent jazz groups as well as a "first call" guitarist for studio, film, and television recording sessions. Kessel was a member of the group of session musicians informally known as the Wrecking Crew.

Biography

Kessel was born in Muskogee, Oklahoma in 1923 to a Jewish family. Kessel's father was an immigrant from Hungary who owned a shoe shop. His only formal musical study was three months of guitar lessons at the age of 12. He began his career as a teenager touring with local dance bands. When he was 16, he started playing with the Oklahoma A&M band, Hal Price & the Varsitonians. The band members nicknamed him "Fruitcake" because he practiced up to 16 hours a day. Kessel gained attention because of his youth and being the only white musician playing in all African American band at black clubs.

In the early 1940s, he moved to Los Angeles, where for one year he was a member of the Chico Marx big band. He appeared in the film Jammin' the Blues, which featured Lester Young. Soon after, he played in the bands of Charlie Barnet and Artie Shaw. During the day, he worked as a studio musician and at night played jazz in clubs. In 1947, he recorded with Charlie Parker. He worked in Jazz at the Philharmonic and for one year in the early 1950s he was a member of the Oscar Peterson trio. After leaving the trio, he recorded several solo albums for Contemporary. He recorded a series of albums with Ray Brown and Shelly Manne as The Poll Winners because the three of them often won polls conducted by Metronome and DownBeat magazines. He was the guitarist on the album Julie Is Her Name (1955) by Julie London, which includes the standard "Cry Me a River", selling a million copies and demonstrated Kessel's chordal approach to guitar.

During the 1960s, Kessel worked for Columbia Pictures and was a member of a band of session musicians known as The Wrecking Crew. At one point, after a two and a half hour session to record a one-chord song, "The Beat Goes On," Kessel is reported to have stood up and proclaimed, "Never have so many played so little for so much." He recorded with pop acts such as The Monkees and The Beach Boys and with jazz musicians Sonny Rollins and Art Tatum. Kessel eventually left studio work to concentrate on his jazz career both onstage and on records. Along with solo work, he formed the ensemble Great Guitars with Charlie Byrd and Herb Ellis.

Kessel was rated the No. 1 guitarist in Esquire, DownBeat, and Playboy magazine polls between 1947 and 1960.

From 1961 to 1974, Gibson Guitars manufactured the Barney Kessel artist signature guitars in Standard and Custom models.

Personal life
Kessel was married to Gail Genovia Farmer in the 50s and 60s, and she is the mother of Kessel's only  children, Dan Kessel and David Kessel. He was then married to Betty Jane (BJ) Baker for 16 years. The couple divorced in 1980. His third marriage to Joanne (Jo) Kessel lasted 10 years, and he was married to his fourth wife, Phyllis Kessel, for 12 years. Kessel's sons Dan Kessel (died Feb 2021) and David Kessel became record producers and session musicians, working with Phil Spector, John Lennon, Cher, Leonard Cohen, The Ramones, Blondie, The Go-Go's and more.

Death
Kessel was in poor health after suffering a stroke in 1992. He died from a brain tumor at his home in San Diego, California, on May 6, 2004, at the age of 80.

Discography

As leader
 Barney Kessel (Contemporary, 1954)
 To Swing or Not to Swing (Contemporary, 1955)
 Kessel Plays Standards (Contemporary, 1956)
 Easy Like (Contemporary, 1956)
 Music to Listen to Barney Kessel By (Contemporary, 1957)
 The Poll Winners with Shelly Manne, Ray Brown (Contemporary, 1957)
 The Poll Winners Ride Again! with Shelly Manne, Ray Brown (Contemporary, 1958)
 Modern Jazz Performances from Bizet's Opera Carmen (Contemporary, 1959)
 Some Like It Hot (Contemporary, 1959)
 Poll Winners Three! with Shelly Manne, Ray Brown (Contemporary, 1960)
 Exploring the Scene! with Shelly Manne, Ray Brown (Contemporary, 1960)
 Bossa Nova Plus Big Band (Reprise, 1961)
 El Tigre with Harold Land (Charlie Parker, 1962)
 Let's Cook! (Contemporary, 1962)
 Breakfast At Tiffany's (Reprise, 1962)
 Barney Kessel's Swingin' Party (Contemporary, 1963)
 Contemporary Latin Rhythms (Reprise, 1963)
 On Fire (Emerald, 1965)
 Kessel's Kit (RCA Victor, 1969)
 Reflections in Rome (RCA Victor, 1969)
 Hair Is Beautiful (Atlantic, 1969)
 Feeling Free (Contemporary, 1969)
 What's New... Barney Kessel? (Mercury, 1969)
 Guitarra (RCA Camden, 1970)
 Swinging Easy! (Black Lion, 1971)
 I Remember Django with Stephane Grappelli (Black Lion, 1971)
 Limehouse Blues with Stephane Grappelli (Freedom, 1972)
 Summertime in Montreux (Black Lion, 1973)
 Easy Moments with Carlos Pes (Gemelli, 1973)
 Two Way Conversation with Red Mitchell (Sonet, 1974)
 Barney (& Friends) Plays Kessel (Concord Jazz, 1975)
 Just Friends (Sonet, 1975)
 Blue Soul (Black Lion, 1975)
 Great Guitars with Charlie Byrd, Herb Ellis (Concord Jazz, 1975)
 The Poll Winners: Straight Ahead with Ray Brown, Shelly Manne (Contemporary, 1975)
 Poor Butterfly with Herb Ellis (Concord Jazz, 1977)
 Soaring (Concord Jazz, 1977)
 Live at Sometime (Trio, 1977)
 A Tribute to the Great Hollywood Stars with Junko Mine (Trio, 1977)
 By Myself (Victor, 1977)
 Great Guitars at the Winery with Charlie Byrd, Herb Ellis (Concord Jazz, 1980)
 Solo (Concord, 1983)
 Great Guitars at Charlie's Georgetown (Concord Jazz, 1983)
 Spontaneous Combustion with Monty Alexander (Contemporary, 1987)
 Red Hot and Blues (Contemporary, 1988)
 Autumn Leaves (Black Lion, 1989)
 Great Guitars Live with Charlie Byrd, Herb Ellis (Concord 2001)
 Live at the Jazz Mill 1954 (Modern Harmonic, 2016)
 Live at the Jazz Mill 1954 Vol. 2 (Modern Harmonic, 2018)

As sideman 

With The Beach Boys
 The Beach Boys Today! (Capitol Records, 1965)
 Pet Sounds (Capitol Records, 1966)

With Benny Carter
 Alone Together (Norgran, 1955)
 Cosmopolite (Norgran, 1956)
 Jazz Giant (Contemporary, 1958)
 Aspects (United Artists, 1959)

With The Coasters
 Riot in Cell Block Number 9 (Spark Records, 1954)
 One Kiss Led to Another (Atco, 1956)
 Down in Mexico (Atco, 1956)
 Young Blood (Atco, 1957)
 Searchin' (Atco, 1957)

With Sam Cooke
 Night Beat (RCA Victor, 1963)
 Ain't That Good News (RCA, 1964)

With Buddy DeFranco
 Generalissimo (Verve, 1959)
 Live Date (Verve, 1959)
 Bravura (Verve, 1959)
 Wailers (Verve, 1960)

With Harry Edison
 Sweets (Clef, 1956)
 Gee Baby, Ain't I Good to You (Verve, 1957)

With Billie Holiday
 Billie Holiday Sings (Clef, 1952)
 Billie Holiday (Clef, 1953)
 Billie Holiday (Clef, 1954)
 Billie Holiday at JATP (Clef, 1954)
 Music for Torching (Clef, 1956)
 Velvet Mood (Clef, 1956)
 Lady Sings the Blues (Clef, 1956)
 Body and Soul (Verve, 1957)
 Songs for Distingué Lovers (Verve, 1957)
 All or Nothing at All (Verve, 1958)

With Peggy Lee
 I Like Men! (Capitol, 1959)
 Then Was Then – Now Is Now! (Capitol, 1965)

With Anita O'Day
 This Is Anita (Verve, 1956)
 Pick Yourself Up with Anita O'Day (Verve, 1957)
 Anita Sings the Winners (Verve, 1958)
 Anita O'Day Swings Cole Porter with Billy May (Verve, 1959)
 Trav'lin' Light (Verve, 1961)

With Oscar Peterson
 The Oscar Peterson Quartet  (Verve, 1955) 
 Romance: The Vocal Styling of Oscar Peterson (Verve, 1956)

With Shorty Rogers
 Martians Come Back! (Atlantic, 1956)
 Way Up There (Atlantic, 1957)
 Chances Are It Swings (RCA Victor, 1958)
 The Wizard of Oz and Other Harold Arlen Songs (RCA Victor, 1959)

With Pete Rugolo
 Out on a Limb (EmArcy, 1956)
 An Adventure in Sound: Reeds in Hi-Fi (Mercury, 1958)
 An Adventure in Sound: Brass in Hi-Fi (Mercury, 1958)

With Sonny & Cher
 Look at Us (Atco Records, 1965)
 In Case You're in Love (Atlantic Records, 1967)

With others
 Georgie Auld, In the Land of Hi-Fi with Georgie Auld and His Orchestra (EmArcy, 1955)
 Louis Bellson, Skin Deep (Norgran, 1953)
 Chet Baker, Albert's House (Beverly Hills, 1969)
 Cher, All I Really Want to Do (EMI Records, 1965)
 Buddy Collette, Man of Many Parts (Contemporary, 1956)
 Sonny Criss, Go Man (Imperial, 1956)
 Dion DiMucci, Born to Be with You (Collectables, 1975)
 Roy Eldridge, Dale's Wail (Clef, 1953)
 Ella Fitzgerald, Ella Fitzgerald Sings the Cole Porter Songbook  (Verve, 1956)
 Wardell Gray, Dexter Gordon, Sonny Criss, Jazz Concert West Coast (Savoy, 1956)
 Hampton Hawes, Four! (Contemporary, 1958)
 Woody Herman, Songs for Hip Lovers (Verve, 1957)
 Milt Jackson, Ballads & Blues (Atlantic, 1956)
 Gene Krupa and Buddy Rich, The Drum Battle (Verve, 1960)
 Julie London, Julie Is Her Name (Liberty, 1955)
 Oliver Nelson, Soulful Brass (Impulse!, 1968)
 Art Pepper and Zoot Sims, Art 'n' Zoot (Pablo, 1995)
 Sonny Rollins, Sonny Rollins and the Contemporary Leaders (Contemporary, 1958)
 Evie Sands, Any Way That You Want Me (Rev-Ola, 1970)
 Ike & Tina Turner, River Deep – Mountain High (A&M, 1966)
 Joe Williams, With Love (Temponic, 1972)

Bibliography

References

External links 

Barney Kessel Interview NAMM Oral History Library (1999)
Barney Kessel Signature Phrases & Analysis

1923 births
2004 deaths
20th-century American guitarists
American jazz guitarists
American music arrangers
American session musicians
Bebop guitarists
Deaths from cancer in California
Concord Records artists
Contemporary Records artists
Cool jazz guitarists
Deaths from brain cancer in the United States
Jazz musicians from Oklahoma
People from Muskogee, Oklahoma
The Wrecking Crew (music) members
West Coast jazz guitarists
American male guitarists
Mainstream jazz guitarists
20th-century American male musicians
American male jazz musicians
Great Guitars (band) members
Black Lion Records artists
Sonet Records artists
Savoy Records artists
RCA Records artists
Oscar Peterson Trio members